Pete Fry is a Canadian politician and business owner in Vancouver, British Columbia, who has served as councillor on the Vancouver City Council since 2018. He is a member of the Green Party of Vancouver.

Owner of a graphics and communications agency in Vancouver, Fry became involved in community activism, serving as community representative for the City of Vancouver's Downtown Eastside Local Area Plan, as well as chair of the Strathcona Residents’ Association. He first ran for city council in the 2014 municipal election, but was not elected.

He then secured the nomination of the Green Party of British Columbia in a 2016 provincial by-election in the riding of Vancouver-Mount Pleasant, where he lost to British Columbia New Democratic Party candidate Melanie Mark. In 2017, he ran for Vancouver City Council a second time, in the by-election following the resignation of Geoff Meggs; he lost to Non-Partisan Association candidate Hector Bremner. At the 2018 city council election, Fry received the second highest number of votes and was elected councillor. He was re-elected as a city councillor in the 2022 Vancouver municipal election. 

Born in Ireland, Fry immigrated with his family to Vancouver as a child. His mother is Hedy Fry, the federal Member of Parliament for Vancouver Centre.

Electoral record

References

Living people
Green Party of Vancouver councillors
Businesspeople from Vancouver
Green Party of British Columbia candidates in British Columbia provincial elections
Irish emigrants to Canada
Year of birth missing (living people)
Canadian people of Trinidad and Tobago descent
21st-century Canadian politicians